This is a list of the 14 members of the European Parliament for Denmark in the 2004 to 2009 session.


List

Party representation

Notes

External links
 List of Danish MEPs (in Danish)

Denmark
List
2004